The following is a list of horse racing venues, ordered by capacity.  The figures generally represent the licensed capacity of the venue, which is usually far higher than the number of seats in the stands.

Currently all venues with a capacity of 40,000 or more are included.

Defunct venues

See also
 List of horse racing venues
 List of stadiums by capacity
 List of sports venues by capacity ATT Stadium in Arlington TX.

References

Venues by capacity
Horse racing venues by capacity